The National Black Republican Association (NBRA) American political organization associated with and supportive of the Republican Party. It was founded in 2005 by Frances Rice, a retired Lieutenant Colonel and attorney of the U.S. Army. Rice is currently the Chairman of the NBRA.

References
 

Black conservatism in the United States
African-American organizations
Politics and race in the United States
Republican Party (United States) organizations